Sandra L. Adickes is best known for the role in the Mississippi Freedom School of 1964, her situation as the plaintiff in Adickes v. S. H. Kress & Co., and her activism during the Vietnam War and with the New York City teachers' union. She is also the author of several books including To be Young was Very Heaven and Legacy of a Freedom School.

Early life and education 
Adickes was born on July 14, 1933 and grew up in New York. Adickes has a B.A. from Douglass College (1954), and an M.A. from Hunter College (1964). In 1977 she earned a Ph.D. from New York University. She has taught English at multiple schools, including the College of Staten Island where she and Elizabeth Worthman began a program called Vocational Education for Transitional Adults to women in need of funds to attend college. She also taught at Winona State University.

Civil rights activism 
In 1964 Adickes was a teacher at Benjamin Franklin High School in East Harlem, New York, and the disappearance of civil rights workers in Mississippi made her "sick and sore at heart" so she joined a group of six teachers from New York City on a civil rights project to Mississippi. The group in New York relied on fundraising by the United Federation of Teachers, and Adickes co-lead the project with Norma Becker. The program was a part of the movement for Freedom Schools in which temporary and free schools were started in the American south to provide new educational opportunities. In the spring of 1963, Adickes was recruited by Richard Parrish an African American officer of the UFT for a freedom school project in Prince Edward County. Adickes signed up to join members of the civil rights movement for the Freedom Summer of 1964 and she helped recruit forty other other teachers for the Freedom Schools.

Supreme Court case 

In 1964, was in Hattiesburg, Mississippi and she took her students to the Hattiesburg Public Library to receive a library card. The library was closed by the chief of police in response to a request from the Hattiesburg town mayor, Claude Pittman. After being denied at the library, she and her students went to get lunch together at a Kress store where they were denied service because Adickes, a white woman, was with six of her black students. 

In response, Adickes sued and filed a lawsuit, with her lawyer Eleanor Jackson Piel. Adickes sued on two counts— (1) her rights under the Equal Protection Clause of the 14th Amendment were violated as she was being denied service on the basis of race, and (2) she claimed the arrest was the result of Kress and Hattiesburg police collusion. The court decision said that Adickes was refused service under color of any . . . custom, or usage, of the State" in violation of her rights under the Equal Protection Clause of the 14th Amendment. Adickes appealed and the Supreme Court granted certiorari. The case was settled out of court, and Adickes gave her portion of the settlement to the Southern Conference Education Fund to be used for scholarships for the black youth.

Later years 
Adickes' activism continued during the Vietnam War when she was again working with Norma Becker in a group called Teachers Committee for Peace in Vietnam who gathered 2700 signatures from people against the war and took out a full page ad on May 30, 1965 in NY Times. She also crossed picket lines in a 1968 New York City teachers' strike when she left the union because she felt it was no longer relevant.

Writings 
Adickes is the author of multiple books. Legends of Good Women is a fiction. To be Young was Very Heaven presents women in New York City in the period prior to World War One, and Legacy of a Freedom School presents Adickes' experiences working with the Student Non-Violent Coordinating Committee.

Select publications

Awards and honors 
Adickes was awarded the “Woman of the Year” by the National Association of Negro Business and Professional Women’s in 1966.

References

Further reading

External links 
Sandra E. Adickes Papers, Special Collections at The University of Southern Mississippi.
Oral History with Sandra Adickes, The University of Southern Mississippi (October 21, 1999)
Adickes v. S. H. Kress & Co. - 398 U.S. 144, 90 S. Ct. 1598 (1970)

Living people
1933 births
Civil rights activists
Winona State University faculty